Monilinia mali is a fungal plant pathogen which causes leaf blight on apple.

References

Fungal tree pathogens and diseases
Apple tree diseases
Sclerotiniaceae
Fungi described in 1945